Kevin O'Loughlin is a Scottish actor and comedian, known for his roles in The Ginge, the Geordie and the Geek, Taggart and Bob Servant, Independent.

Career

O'Loughlin trained at the Royal Conservatoire of Scotland (RSAMD). Whilst training, he starred in numerous productions including Richard III, The Cherry Orchard and Oedipus.

Since graduating, O'Loughlin has appeared on a number of popular television programmes including Taggart, Sirens and River City. He also appeared in 2 episodes of the popular comedy sitcom Bob Servant, Independent as a police inspector who is constantly irritated by Servant and his whacky ideas.

He gained popularity for his role in the BBC Two sketch show The Ginge, the Geordie and the Geek along with Paul Charlton and Graeme Rooney.

Television

Taggart (2010) as Scott Clarkson
Sirens (2011) as Dan
Bob Servant (2013) as Police inspector 
Waterloo Road (2013) as Sol
The Ginge, the Geordie and the Geek (2013) as the Geek (various)
Blandings (2014) as Binstead
Lovesick (2014) as Charlie

References

Scottish male television actors
Scottish male comedians
Living people
Male actors from Glasgow
Year of birth missing (living people)
Scottish male stage actors
21st-century Scottish male actors
Alumni of the Royal Conservatoire of Scotland
Comedians from Glasgow